The Adolph Lomb Medal, awarded by the Optical Society is a prize for young scientists (age 35 or younger) for their contributions to optics. It is named after Adolph Lomb, treasurer of the Optical Society of America from its founding until his death in 1942.

Medal Winners 

1940 David MacAdam
1942 James G. Baker
1944 R. Clark Jones
1946 Wayne C. Norton
1948 David S. Grey
1950 H. Richard Blackwell
1952 Aden B. Meinel
1954 William Sinton
1956 Walter R. J. Brown
1958 Edward L. O'Neill
1960 Ian Mills
1962 Jean-Pierre Barrat
1964 Gordon H. Spencer
1966 C. Kumar Patel
1968 Douglas C. Sinclair
1970 Marlan O. Scully
1972 Robert L. Byer
1974 James Forsyth
1976 Marc D. Levenson
1978 Eli Yablonovitch
1980 David M. Bloom
1982 Won T. Tsang
1984 Edward H. Adelson
1986 David A. B. Miller
1988 Janis A. Valdmanis
1990 Andrew M. Weiner
1992 David F. Welch
1992 Mohammed N. Islam
1993 Henry C. Kapteyn
1994 Robert W. Schoenlein
1995 Turan Erdoğan
1996 Frederick A. Kish Jr.
1997 Ekmel Özbay
1998 Benjamin J. Eggleton
1999 Jun Ye
2000 Mikhail Lukin
2001 Barbara A. Paldus
2002 Susana Marcos Celestino
2003 Alexei Vladimirovich Sokolov
2004 Randy A. Bartels
2005 Marin Soljacic
2006 John Charles Howell
2007 Shanhui Fan
2008 L. Cary Gunn
2009 Rebekah A. Drezek
2010 Jeremy O'Brien
2011 Elizabeth Hillman
2012 Hatice Altug
2013 Andrea Alù
2014 Alexander Szameit
2015 Jeremy N. Munday
2016 Jennifer Dionne
2017 Dirk Robert Englund
2018 Andrei Faraon
2019 Laura Na Liu
2020 Chaoyang Lu
2021 Laura Waller
2022 Ido Kaminer

Source:

See also

 List of physics awards

References

Awards of Optica (society)
Early career awards